AIDAdiva is a Sphinx class cruise ship operated by the German cruise line AIDA Cruises. The ship was built at Meyer Werft in Papenburg, Germany.

References

Notes

Bibliography

External links

Official AIDAdiva website 

Ships built in Papenburg
Ships of AIDA Cruises
2007 ships